The first moment of area is based on the mathematical construct moments in metric spaces.  It is a measure of the spatial distribution of a shape in relation to an axis.

The first moment of area of a shape, about a certain axis, equals the sum over all the infinitesimal parts of the shape of the area of that part times its distance from the axis [Σad].  

First moment of area is commonly used to determine the centroid of an area.

Definition
Given an area, A, of any shape, and division of that area into n number of very small, elemental areas (dAi). Let xi and yi be the distances (coordinates) to each elemental area measured from a given x-y axis. Now, the first moment of area in the x and y directions are respectively given by: 
 
and 

The SI unit for first moment of area is a cubic metre (m3). In the American Engineering and Gravitational systems the unit is a cubic foot (ft3) or more commonly inch3.

The static or statical moment of area, usually denoted by the symbol Q, is a property of a shape that is used to predict its resistance to shear stress.  By definition:

where
 Qj,x – the first moment of area "j" about the neutral x axis of the entire body (not the neutral axis of the area "j");
 dA – an elemental area of area "j";
 y – the perpendicular distance to the centroid of element dA from the neutral axis x.

Shear stress in a semi-monocoque structure

The equation for shear flow in a particular web section of the cross-section of a semi-monocoque structure is:

q – the shear flow through a particular web section of the cross-section
Vy – the shear force perpendicular to the neutral axis x through the entire cross-section
Sx – the first moment of area about the neutral axis x for a particular web section of the cross-section
Ix – the second moment of area about the neutral axis x for the entire cross-section

Shear stress may now be calculated using the following equation:

  – the shear stress through a particular web section of the cross-section
q – the shear flow through a particular web section of the cross-section
t – the thickness of a particular web section of the cross-section at the point being measured

See also
 Second moment of area
 Polar moment of inertia
 Section modulus

References

Solid mechanics
Moment (physics)